Nadia Khan (born 27 February 2001) is a Pakistani footballer who plays as a forward for English club Doncaster Rovers Belles and the Pakistan national team.

Born in England, she represents the Pakistan football team. Khan is one of the first British-Pakistani women to play international football for the Pakistan national team.

Club career
Khan began her football career at the Leeds United regional talent centre. Khan first wore a Doncaster Rovers Belles shirt in 2017 when she joined the club's development side. In 2018, she joined her teammates in moving to the first-team to compete in the FA Women's National League Northern Premier Division.

In October 2022, Khan made her 75th first-team appearance for the Belles. She was the club's longest-serving player.

International career 
Khan made her international debut for the Pakistan national team on 7 September 2022, against India at the 2022 SAFF Women's Championship in their 3–0 defeat. Khan scored four goals in Pakistan's 7–0 win over the Maldives at the tournament. She scored in the 53rd, 78th and 84th minutes to complete her hat-trick and then again netted the ball in the 89th minute to score her fourth goal. The four-goal haul made her the Pakistan national team's joint-all-time top goalscorer.

She is also included in Pakistani squad for Four Nation Cup 2023 Saudi Arabia at Khobar, Saudi Arabia

Career statistics

International 

Scores and results list Pakistan's goal tally first, score column indicates score after each Khan goal.

References

External links
 Nadia Khan at doncasterroversfc.co.uk
 Nadia Khan at hamrokhelkud.com

2001 births
Living people
Footballers from Leeds
English people of Pakistani descent
British sportspeople of Pakistani descent
Citizens of Pakistan through descent
Pakistani women's footballers
British Asian footballers
Women's association football forwards
Doncaster Rovers Belles L.F.C. players
Pakistan women's international footballers